Frank Islacker (born 29 August 1963) is a retired German football forward. At age 19, Islacker was forced to retire after suffering a severe knee injury. He is the son of Franz Islacker and the father of Mandy Islacker.

References

External links
 

1963 births
Living people
German footballers
Bundesliga players
VfL Bochum players
Association football forwards
West German footballers